Hannah Marshall may refer to:

Hannah Marshall (visual artist) (born 1982), British visual artist and former fashion designer
Hannah Marshall (actress) (born 1984), New Zealand actress
Hannah Marshall (musician) (born 1973), British jazz musician and composer